The San Rafael Block or San Rafael Massif (Spanish: Bloque de San Rafael or Macizo de San Rafael) is an uplifted area in central Mendoza Province, Argentina. The San Rafael Block is both a geographic and a tectonic unit. From a tectonostratigraphic view, some geologists consider it an exposure of the Cuyania (Precordillera) terrane being its southern extension. The San Rafael Block crops out  to the south of the other exposures of Cuyania. The San Rafael Block forms the northeastern boundary of the Neuquén Basin.

See also 

 North Patagonian Massif
 Reserva Provincial La Payunia
 San Rafael orogeny

References 

Geology of Mendoza Province
Geography of Mendoza Province